Fires Within is a 1991 film directed by Gillian Armstrong. It stars Jimmy Smits, Greta Scacchi and Vincent D'Onofrio.

Plot
Set in the Cuban community in Miami, the story revolves around the relationship between Nestor (Smits), a recently released political prisoner, his wife Isabel (Scacchi), who had fled Cuba after Nestor was imprisoned, and Sam (D'Onofrio), the fisherman who had rescued Isabel from almost certain death at sea.

Cast
Jimmy Smits as Nestor
Greta Scacchi as Isabel
Vincent D'Onofrio as Sam
Luis Avalos as Victor Hernandez
Bertila Damas as Estella Sanchez
Brian Miranda as Victor Hernandez, Jr.

Production
Because she'd never had them done previously, Greta Scacchi had to have her ears pierced especially for her role as Isabel, so that she would be able to wear the large gold hoop earrings favoured by many Cuban women.

References

External links

1991 films
Films directed by Gillian Armstrong
Films scored by Maurice Jarre
Metro-Goldwyn-Mayer films
1990s English-language films